Cheung On Estate is a public housing estate in Tsing Yi Island, New Territories, Hong Kong built on reclaimed land in Tsing Yi North near Tsing Yi Northeast Park and MTR Tsing Yi station. It consists of ten residential blocks completed between 1987 and 1989. Among 7,338 flats in the estate, 5,617 flats have been sold to the residents under the TPS Phase 1 since January 1998.

Houses

Demographics
According to the 2016 by-census, Cheung On Estate had a population of 21,791. The median age was 48.4 and the majority of residents (96.1 per cent) were of Chinese ethnicity. The average household size was 3 people. The median monthly household income of all households (i.e. including both economically active and inactive households) was HK$30,600.

Politics
For the 2019 District Council election, the estate fell within two constituencies. Most of the estate is located in the Cheung On constituency, which was formerly represented by Cheung Man-lung until July 2021, while the remainder of the estate falls within the On Ho constituency, which was formerly represented by Warren Tam Ka-chun until July 2021.

See also

Public housing estates on Tsing Yi Island

References

Tsing Yi
Public housing estates in Hong Kong
Tenants Purchase Scheme